Sonhos d'ouro is a novel written by the Brazilian writer José de Alencar. It  was first published in 1872.

External links
 Sonhos d'ouro, the book

1872 Brazilian novels
Novels by José de Alencar
Portuguese-language novels